This List of rail trails in South Carolina lists former railroad right-of-ways in South Carolina that have been converted to rail trails designed for pedestrian, bicycle, skating, and/or equestrian traffic. Rail trails are multi-use paths offering at least pedestrians and cyclists recreational access to the routes for public use.

South Carolina contains a total of 16 different rail trails.

UPCOUNTRY

Anderson
Cherokee
Triple C Rail Trail
Greenville
Swamp Rabbit Trail
Oconee
Blue Ridge Railroad Historical
Pickens
Spartanburg
Mary Black Rail Trail

MIDLANDS
Aiken
Cathedral Aisle Trail
North Augusta Greeneway
Chester
Kings Mountain Railroad Trail
Edgefield
Ten Governors Rail Trail
Greenwood
Heritage Trail
York
Carolina & North-Western Rail Trail
Kings Mountain Railroad Trail a rough  trail mostly for hikers but some mountain biking. 
Triple C Rail Trail
York Bicycle Trail

LOW COUNTRY
Beaufort
Spanish Moss Trail
Berkeley 
Swamp Fox Passage (part of the Palmetto Trail)
Charleston
Swamp Fox Passage (part of the Palmetto Trail)
West Ashley Bikeway
West Ashley Greenway
Colleton
Edisto Nature Trail
Florence 
Florence Rail Trail
Marion 
Marion Hike and Bike Trail

References

External links
South Carolina State Trails Program Rail Trail page
Triple C Rail Trail information page

Rail trails in South Carolina
Rail trails
Bike paths in South Carolina
Urban planning in the United States
Mountain biking venues in the United States
Hiking trails in South Carolina
South